El Lute II: Tomorrow I'll be Free is a 1988 Spanish film written and directed by Vicente Aranda, based on the memoirs of Eleuterio Sánchez, “El Lute”, a delinquent who became notorious in Spain for his jail escapes in the 60's. It stars Imanol Arias, Angel Pardo and Jorge Sanz. The film continues the story of El Lute: camina o revienta.

Synopsis 
This is the story of a man fighting with all his might for his life and his freedom. Eleuterio ("El Lute") embarks upon an action-packed future, fuelled by the notions of freedom and dreams of living just as his countrymen, ever-growing in his mind. Nothing and no-one can stop him. After escaping the Puerto de Santa María prison, the reunion with his family is just the beginning of what will become an endless escape.

Cast
Imanol Arias as Eleuterio Sánchez 'El Lute'
Jorge Sanz as Toto
 Ángel Pardo as Lolo
Pastora Vega as Esperanza
Blanca Apilánez as Maria
Montserrat Tey as Emilia

Reception
El Lute II: mañana seré libre opened in May 1988 at the 1988 Cannes Film Festival. The film was not as successful as the first part.

DVD release
 El Lute II: mañana sere libre, is available in Region 1 DVD. The film is included in the same DVD that *El Lute: camina o revienta.  In Spanish with English subtitles, the transfer is not of good quality.

References

External links
 
Web Oficial de Vicente Aranda

1988 films
1980s Spanish-language films
1980s biographical drama films
Spanish biographical drama films
Films directed by Vicente Aranda
1988 drama films
1980s Spanish films